IPSC may refer to:
 International Practical Shooting Confederation, a shooting sport association based on the concept of practical shooting
 Ispahani Public School & College, a school in Chittagong, Bangladesh
 Institute for the Protection and Security of the Citizen, located in Ispra, Italy, is one of the seven institutes of the Joint Research Centre, a Directorate-General of the European Commission
 Internet Problem Solving Contest, an online programming competition
 IP Site Connect, a feature of digital mobile radio (DMR)

iPSC may refer to:
 Induced pluripotent stem cell, a type of pluripotent induced stem cell
 Intel iPSC, any of several high-performance computers manufactured by Intel
 Intermountain Power Services Corporation.

See also
 Iota Piscium (ι Psc) a star
 Pisces I (Psc I) a galaxy